"Soch Na Sake" is a song from the 2016 Indian film Airlift, an adapted version of Hardy Sandhu's "Soch", sung by Arijit Singh and Tulsi Kumar. The  lyrics for the song is written by Kumaar and the music is composed by Amaal Mallik. The song is a melodious mixture of Hindi and Punjabi lyrics. There is also a solo version of the song, sung by Arijit Singh.

Music video

Synopsis 
The song is picturized upon Akshay Kumar and Nimrat Kaur, lead cast of the film. The song expresses the anguish that couples feel when they part, and the deep bond they share. The song starts with Ranjit (Akshay) leaving his love Amrita (Nimrat) for Baghdad in order to negotiate a safe passages for the stranded Indian refugees in Kuwait City. A flashback is shown where the couple visualize the moments which they spent with each other.

Accolades
It won 2017 Mirchi Music Award for Listeners' Choice Song of The Year. Arijit Singh and Tulsi Kumar won 2016 GiMA MTV Duet of the Year Award for the song under non-film category. Tulsi Kumar won Best Female Playback Singer award for the song at IIFA Awards.

References

2015 songs
Songs written for films
Hindi film songs
Arijit Singh songs
Songs with lyrics by Kumaar
Songs with music by Amaal Mallik
Macaronic songs